Keef may refer to:

Kief, cannabis preparation

People
Keith Richards (born 1943), English guitarist
Keef Hartley (1944–2011), English drummer
Keef Trouble (born 1949), English musician
Keef Cowboy (1960–1989), American rapper
Keefy Keef (born 1974), American rapper
Chief Keef (born 1995), American rapper
Keith Knight (cartoonist) (born 1966), American cartoonist

Other
Keef the Thief, 1989 video game
Alan Keef, British engineering company
Keith, a character from Voltron
Keef, a character from Invader Zim

See also
Keith (disambiguation)